Black Brook is a stream in Mille Lacs County, in the U.S. state of Minnesota. It is a tributary of the Rum River.

Black Brook was named for its peat-stained water.

See also
List of rivers of Minnesota

References

Rivers of Mille Lacs County, Minnesota
Rivers of Minnesota